Jogeshwari (station code: JOS) is a railway station in the Jogeshwari suburb of Mumbai city. The station lies on the Western line of the Mumbai Suburban Railway network between Andheri and Ram Mandir railway stations. On March 29, 2018, Harbour line was extended from Mumbai CSMT to Goregaon.

Jogeshwari Station has 6 platforms, where its two platforms of harbour line are constructed towards north of main platforms.

References

Railway stations opened in 1867
1867 establishments in India
Railway stations in Mumbai Suburban district
Mumbai Suburban Railway stations
Mumbai WR railway division